Kim Hyo-jin (born 22 October 1990) is a Korean footballer currently playing as a midfielder for Paju Citizen.

Career statistics

Club

Notes

References

1990 births
Living people
South Korean footballers
South Korean expatriate footballers
Association football midfielders
K League 1 players
K League 2 players
Gangwon FC players
Hwaseong FC players
Kim Hyo-jin
Kim Hyo-jin
South Korean expatriate sportspeople in Thailand
Expatriate footballers in Thailand